Nəsimi (until 2004, Xersonovka and Khersonovka) is a village and municipality in the Sabirabad Rayon of Azerbaijan.  It has a population of 702.

References 

Populated places in Sabirabad District